Chief Inspector Armand Gamache is the main character in a series of mystery novels written by Canadian author Louise Penny. The series is set around the life of Chief Inspector Armand Gamache of Sûreté du Québec, the provincial police force for Quebec. Books in the series have been nominated for and received numerous awards.

The first book in the series, Still Life, was released in 2006 and won the New Blood Dagger award, Arthur Ellis Award, the Dilys Award, 2007 Anthony Award, and the Barry Award. All subsequent novels in the series have won major crime-writing awards in three countries. Many have also made the New York Times Best-Seller List, debuting as high as #1.

Summary
The Chief Inspector Armand Gamache book series is written by Louise Penny. Prior to writing full-time, she worked 20 years as a radio journalist and host for CBC Radio in Thunder Bay, Ontario and Winnipeg, Manitoba. Penny originally began writing a historical novel, but changed to mystery writing after finding trouble finishing. She entered the first book of the series, Still Life, in the "Debut Dagger" competition in the United Kingdom, placing second out of 800 entries.

The series revolves around the character of Chief Inspector Armand Gamache. The stories take place usually in the village of Three Pines, with Gamache investigating the murders of various people in each novel. The native French speaker Gamache speaks English with a British accent.  In the first book Still Life, he is said to have learned English while he was an undergraduate at Christ's College, Cambridge, where according to A Great Reckoning he read for a degree in History.

The books have been described as "character-driven" mysteries that explore the relationships between characters with each book in the series. Three Pines is a fictional location set in the province of Quebec, with Penny setting up the characters using the history of old Canada to show their personalities and backgrounds. In the series, a few of the plots are set outside of Three Pines.

The Chief Inspector Armand Gamache book series contains little or no sex or violence and has been referred to as a kinder and gentler alternative to modern crime fiction. Penny herself stated that "The Murder Stone, like all the Gamache novels, is about love and friendship. About belonging and hope. And finding kindness buried. In the wilderness. In the marrow".

In How the Light Gets In, Penny writes that: "Armand Gamache had always held unfashionable beliefs. He believed the light would banish the shadows. That kindness was more powerful than cruelty, and that goodness existed, even in the most desperate places. He believed that evil had its limits". In many of the books from Still Life onwards Gamache tells new detectives joining his team "four sayings that can lead to wisdom": "I was wrong. I'm sorry. I don't know. I need help".

More of Gamache's approach is shared in A Better Man, when he shares with one of his colleagues advice he himself was given at the start of his career: "Before speaking ... you might want to ask yourself three questions ... Is it true? Is it kind? Does it need to be said?".

Books

There are a total of 18 books in the series, all published by Minotaur Books, an imprint of St. Martin's Press. The first book was released in 2005, in the U.S., with the most recent in 2022. There is also a short novella called The Hangman which features Inspector Gamache and is set in Three Pines. This does not form part of the series and was written as a simple story for adults learning to read English. Gamache also appears briefly as a minor character in State of Terror (2021), a political thriller co-written with Hillary Clinton.

Awards and recognition
In addition to numerous books making it to the New York Times Bestseller List, Penny has won multiple awards for the book series. She has won the Anthony and the Agatha Awards 5 times each and the Canadian Arthur Ellis Award twice. She was also a finalist for the Edgar Award for How The Light Gets In. The books have also earned her numerous Macavity Awards, and been nominated for numerous others.

Adaptations
Still Life was adapted as a film for CBC Television in 2013, with Gamache being played by British actor Nathaniel Parker.

Alfred Molina plays Gamache in the Amazon Prime series Three Pines, which began filming in September 2021 and aired in December 2022.

References

External links
 Chief Inspector Armand Gamache official website

Series of books
Canadian mystery novels
Fictional Canadian police detectives
Fictional characters from Quebec